The 1959 Texas A&M Aggies football team represented Texas A&M University in the 1959 NCAA University Division football season as a member of the Southwest Conference (SWC). The Aggies were led by head coach Jim Myers in his second season and finished with a record of three wins and seven losses (3–7 overall, 0–6 in the SWC).

Schedule

Roster
QB Charlie Milstead, Sr.

References

Texas AandM
Texas A&M Aggies football seasons
Texas AandM Aggies football